Bush City is an unincorporated community in Anderson County, Kansas, United States.

History
Bush City had a post office from 1880 until 1956, but the post office was called Haskell until 1921.

References

Further reading

External links
 Anderson County maps: Current, Historic, KDOT

Unincorporated communities in Anderson County, Kansas
Unincorporated communities in Kansas